Melania is a feminine given name that derives from the Greek word  (melania) meaning "black, dark".

People named Melania include:

 Melania the Elder (350–410), a Christian saint and an influential figure in the ascetic movement
 Melania the Younger (383–439), a Christian saint who lived during the reign of Emperor Flavius Augustus Honorius
 Melania Albea (born 1980), Swiss figure skater
 Melania Alvarez, Mexican mathematics educator in Canada
 Melania "Melani" Costa (born 1989), Spanish swimmer
 Melania Cristescu, Romanian–Canadian biologist
 Melania Gabbiadini (born 1983), Italian former footballer
 Melania Grego (born 1973), Italian former water polo player
 Melania Hotu (born 1959), provincial governor of Rapa Nui (Easter Island)
 Melania Mazzucco (born 1966), Italian author
 Melania Trump (born 1970), Slovene–American model and former First Lady of the United States
 Melania Ursu (1940–2016), Romanian stage and film actress

See also 

 Melanie
 Mélanie
 Melaina, a Corycian nymph in Greek mythology

References 

Feminine given names
Given names of Greek language origin
Greek feminine given names
Italian feminine given names
Spanish feminine given names
Portuguese feminine given names
Russian feminine given names
Ukrainian feminine given names
Polish feminine given names
Romanian feminine given names
Bulgarian feminine given names
Slovene feminine given names
Serbian feminine given names
Croatian feminine given names